

This is a list of the National Register of Historic Places listings in Calhoun County, South Carolina.

This is intended to be a complete list of the properties on the National Register of Historic Places in Calhoun County, South Carolina, United States.  The locations of National Register properties for which the latitude and longitude coordinates are included below, may be seen in a map.

There are 17 properties listed on the National Register in the county.

Current listings

|}

See also

List of National Historic Landmarks in South Carolina
National Register of Historic Places listings in South Carolina

References

Calhoun County